Asura bipartita is a moth of the family Erebidae. It is found on the Dampier Archipelago.

References

bipartita
Moths described in 1916
Moths of Australia